Latrobe School District is a school district located in Shingle Springs, California, U.S. the district educates about 200 students in Kindergarten to eighth grade in two schools.

Latrobe Elementary School 
Latrobe Elementary School is a part of the Latrobe School District. It was founded in 1864 by large landowner James Miller. The elementary school is located in Shingle Springs, California approximately 0.5 miles (0.8 kilometers) east north east of Miller's Hill Middle School and 8.15 miles (13.12 kilometers) north east of Ponderosa High School. Both can be schools found in the Latrobe School District. The school has grades kindergarten through third and a mid-sized cafeteria.

Miller's Hill Middle School 
Miller's Hill, being part of the Latrobe School District, is a middle school that enrolls students 4th through 8th grades. They strive themselves on helping students  succeed in life. The on-campus buildings include: five classrooms, one maintenance shed, administrative office, library, computer lab, gym, cafeteria, and science room.

Gallery

References

External links 
 

School districts in El Dorado County, California
School districts established in 1864
1864 establishments in California